State Highway 34 (SH 34) is a route that runs from Honey Grove to Italy just east of the Dallas/Fort Worth Metroplex.

History

SH 34 was originally proposed on November 19, 1917, starting in Ft. Worth travelling southeast to Ennis. On October 15, 1923, SH 34 was extended to Kaufman. On December 17, 1923, SH 34 was extended to Greenville, replacing SH 38. On May 25, 1925, the eastern end had been extended north to Honey Grove. On December 21, 1926, it extended north to the Oklahoma border via the current FM 100. On October 10, 1927, the western end had been extended to near Jacksboro. On July 15, 1935, the section north of Honey Grove was cancelled.

On September 26, 1939, the section from Jacksboro to Ennis was removed from SH 34, becoming parts of U.S. Highway 287 and SH 319 (which became part of SH 199 one month later).  It was instead routed farther southwest into Italy, replacing SH 306. SH 34 was to retain its pre-1939 route in earlier renumbering plans.

In or around 1945, the section from Kaufman to Ennis was re-routed through Scurry, south of Rosser, and on a new bridge over the Trinity River.  The former route from Scurry to Peeltown (Kaufman County) was assigned to an extension of Farm to Market Road 148, and about a mile of the old route is now Farm to Market Road 1181 in Telico (Ellis County).  The old bridge over the Trinity River no longer exists ; in addition, the replacement bridge (a narrow, two-lane truss bridge) was replaced with a wider, traditional span. On August 18, 1987, SH 34 was extended north from US 77 to I-35E, replacing FM 1134. On April 24, 2003, SH 34 was extended east and north concurrent with SH 56 and FM 100 to US 82.

A bypass around the city of Terrell was designated on February 28, 2013, but completed in early 2014. Construction began in October 2014 on a bypass around the city of Kaufman, with construction lasting approximately 22 months. The section south of US 175 opened in May 2016. The section north of US 175 opened around August 2016, and the old route north of US 175 was given to the city. The old route south of US 175 was given to the city on September 24, 2020.

Route description

SH 34 begins at I-35E in the community of Italy. The highway runs southeast through the town to US 77 before turning in a more east direction. Near Avalon, the highway turns to the northeast and runs through the community of Bardwell before crossing Lake Bardwell. After crossing the lake, SH 34 enters Ennis and intersects US 287. The highway shares overlaps with the business routes of I-45 and US 287 in the city and leaves the city after intersecting I-45.

After crossing the Trinity River, SH 34 enters Kaufman County and runs near the communities of Scurry and Rosser before entering Kaufman. The highway intersects US 175 and shares an overlap with SH 243 in the city. Leaving the city, SH 34 runs in a sharp northeast direction for a few miles, turning north in Oak Ridge. In southern Terrell, the highway intersects I-20, which is the sight of a Tanger Outlet Center. Near Terrell Municipal Airport, SH 34 runs along a new alignment, bypassing the downtown area of the city and crosses over US 80. Leaving Terrell, the highway runs by many farms before turning more north and running near the western shore of Lake Tawakoni. In Quinlan, the highway shares a short overlap with SH 276 and crosses near an inlet of Tawakoni north of the town.

Entering Hunt County, SH 34 runs in a straight north direction. The highway enters Greenville and intersects I-30/US 67, which used to be a cloverleaf interchange. Shortly after intersecting US 69/US 380, SH 34 overlaps with a business route of US 69 through the city's downtown area. Leaving the city, the highway serves as the western terminus for SH 224. North of Wolfe City, the highway makes a sharp turn and runs east for a few miles before turning back north in Ladonia. SH 34 intersects SH 56 in Honey Grove before terminating at US 82 just north of the town.

Business routes
There are two business routes for State Highway 34.

Business State Highway 34-A is a bypass of Terrell, designated on February 28, 2013 and completed in early 2014.

A second business route serves the downtown area of Kaufman, along Washington Street and Mulberry Street.  The route runs along a previous routing of SH 34.  It became a business route after a bypass was completed in October 2016 around the south and east sides of Kaufman for SH 34.

Junction list

References

External links

034
Transportation in Ellis County, Texas
Transportation in Kaufman County, Texas
Transportation in Hunt County, Texas
Transportation in Fannin County, Texas